Few Options, also known as Few Options, All Bad, is a 2011 American feature-length crime drama written and directed by George Pappy.

Plot summary
When a convicted drug smuggler leaves prison after 22 years for one youthful mistake, he just wants to start over and obey the law. But, unable to find work, he's forced to take a supposedly legitimate job with his old crime partners. And they have big plans for their newest employee.

Cast

 Kenny Johnson as Frank Connor
 Erin Daniels as Helen Martin
 David Marciano as Russ 
 Brad Dourif as Chris Pendler
 Rainn Wilson as Cousin Don
 Michael Sheen as The Florist
 Laura San Giacomo as The Ticket Agent
 Dayton Callie as Warden Winslow
 Christian Stokes as Mike Colton
 Cindy Baer as Jillian

Exhibition
The film had its U.S. debut at The Valley Film Festival on November 12, 2011.  The film was first televised in the U.S. on Showtime on April 23, 2012.

References

External links
 

2011 films
2011 crime thriller films
2011 crime drama films
American crime thriller films
American crime drama films
Films set in Los Angeles
Films shot in Los Angeles
American independent films
Films set in the 2010s
2011 directorial debut films
2010s English-language films
2010s American films